Return to the Hiding Place is a 2013 film based upon the factual accounting of Hans Poley's World War II encounter with Corrie ten Boom, his involvement in the Dutch resistance and its wartime harboring of Jewish refugees. A non-Jewish fugitive after he refused to pledge his allegiance to the Nazis, Poley was the first person hidden from the Nazis in the Ten Boom House, which is today a museum in Haarlem, Netherlands.  The film is adapted, in part, from Poley's book, Return to the Hiding Place (1993),  personal recollections, relayed to screenwriter Dr. Peter C. Spencer, and research from the Dutch National Archives. The film is neither a prequel nor is it a sequel to the 1975 film The Hiding Place, instead, it is a congruent accounting of the Dutch underground's resistance efforts from Poley's perspective.  It was directed by Peter C. Spencer and starred John Rhys-Davies, Mimi Sagadin and Craig Robert Young.

Background 
On May 15, 1940, German occupation of the Netherlands begins with the nation's surrender, food and materials are rationed and evening curfews are imposed, gradually tightening from 10:00 p.m. to 6:00 a.m. Persecution of the Jewish population also is gradually implemented, starting with the requirement of wearing a yellow star bearing the word "Jew" and attacks against Jewish businesses and places of worship and culminating in the mass transport of Jewish citizens to unknown locations. Conspiracy theories begin to emerge on the fate of those being transported to the concentration camps.

Corrie ten Boom (15 April 1892 – 15 April 1983) and her family are actively involved in the Dutch underground, invite the persecuted to live in their home and create a hidden room to conceal them during searches. Hans Poley, a young Christian, is the first guest and benefactor of the ten Boom family's extraordinary hospitality in May 1943.

Poley's persecution begins with his refusal to sign the Nazi Manifesto, which reads in part:
23. We demand legal opposition to known lies and their promulgation through the press. In order to enable the provision of a German press, we demand, that:

a. All writers and employees of the newspapers appearing in the German language be members of the race; 
b. Non-German newspapers be required to have the express permission of the State to be published. They may not be printed in the German language; 
c. Non-Germans are forbidden by law any financial interest in German publications, or any influence on them, and as punishment for violations the closing of such a publication as well as the immediate expulsion from the Reich of the non-German concerned. Publications which are counter to the general good are to be forbidden. We demand legal prosecution of artistic and literary forms which exert a destructive influence on our national life, and the closure of organizations opposing the above made demands.

24. We demand freedom of religion for all religious denominations within the state so long as they do not endanger its existence or oppose the moral senses of the Germanic race. The Party as such advocates the standpoint of a positive Christianity without binding itself confessionally to any one denomination. It combats the Jewish-materialistic spirit within and around us, and is convinced that a lasting recovery of our nation can only succeed from within on the framework: The good of the state before the good of the individual.

25. For the execution of all of this we demand the formation of a strong central power in the Reich. Unlimited authority of the central parliament over the whole Reich and its organizations in general. The forming of state and profession chambers for the execution of the laws made by the Reich within the various states of the confederation. The leaders of the Party promise, if necessary by sacrificing their own lives, to support by the execution of the points set forth above without consideration.

Cast 
Cast overview, first billed only:

Filming locations 
Haarlem, North Holland, Netherlands
Holland, Michigan, USA
Manistee, Michigan, USA

Awards

|+ Return to the Hiding Place
|-
| 2013
| San Antonio Independent Christian Film Festival
| Audience Choice Award
| 
|-
| 2013
| San Antonio Independent Christian Film Festival
| Best Feature Film 
| 
|-
| 2013
| Accolade Competition
| Award of Excellence	 Feature Film  
| 
|-
| 2013
| Central Florida Film Festival
| Festival Prize Best Feature Film  
| 
|-
| 2013
| Bel Air Film Festival
| Best Jury Feature: Film  
| 
|-
| 2013
| Bel Air Film Festival
| Best Jury Feature: Cinematography  
| 
|-
| 2013
| Bel Air Film Festival
| Best Jury Feature: Directing 
| 
|}

See also 
 Return to the Hiding Place, by Hans Poley, Lifejourney Books (1993)  
 The Hiding Place, a 1971 autobiography by Corrie ten Boom
 The Hiding Place, a 1975 film based on the book by Corrie ten Boom

References

External links
 

2013 films
2010s English-language films